The Australia women's national softball team, also known as the Aussie Spirit, is the national softball team of Australia. It is governed by Softball Australia and takes part in international softball competitions. They are one of Australia's most successful women's sporting teams on the world stage, and they have achieved outstanding results over the last 3 decades. Alongside the USA team, the Aussie Spirit are the only other team to medal at all 4 Olympics that softball was included as a sport in the Olympics program. At the inaugural Women's Softball World Championship held in Melbourne, 1965. Australia claimed the first ever title, winning Gold and stamped themselves as a pioneer in the sport.

Funding
The national team has not secured as much funding as male dominated sports in Australia despite having performed better than some and having won major international competitions. The removal of softball from the Olympic programme resulted in the national team getting less funding.

History
Australian women competed in their first international competition in 1949 when they played a series against New Zealand in St Kilda at the St Kilda Cricket Ground. 10,000 people watched the game live. The first international for Australian women took place in 1951 when the Australians toured New Zealand. Australia won both games against the New Zealanders. In 1960, Australia hosted its first international tournament with national teams from Australia, New Zealand and South Africa competing. At the tournament, Australia beat South Africa by a score of 2–1. Australia hosted the event again in 1962, where they beat the New Zealanders in the final 2–1. At the ISF Women's World Championship, Australia finished first in 1965 and second in 1998. The 1965 victory was considered very impressive as they beat the Americans, who invented the game in 1887, to win the championship. Between 1949 and 1967, Australia's senior women's side was undefeated in international play.

Women's World Championship
Australia's women have won the World Championships. Australia was one of five nations to compete at the inaugural ISF Women's World Championship held in Melbourne, Victoria in 1965. At the time Australia hosted the event, the sport was being played by women across the country on the club and school level. At the 1965 Championships, Australia played two games against the United States where they shut them out and allowed them to score no runs. In 1974, Australia was knocked out at the semi-finals stage by the Americans by a score of 6–0. Australia finished second to the United States at the 1998 championship.  They lost in a one hit shutout. This was their best finish since the competition's inception. Australia will compete at the 2012 edition.

Olympics

Australia competed at all four Olympic Games where the sport was played.  At them, they won three bronze medals and a silver.

1996 Olympic Team
Going into the 1996 Summer Olympics, Australia were considered one of the favourites to possibly win gold. The Australians beat the Americans at the 1996 Olympics. Australia finished with a bronze medal.

2000 Olympic Team
The 2000 Games were played in Sydney. They had to beat the Americans to qualify for the gold medal, but lost 1–0 in a shut out. The Australians beat the Americans during the early part of the competition during pool play.

2004 Olympic Team
Australia won a silver medal at the 2004 Summer Olympics in Athens.

2008 Olympic Team
Australia earned a bronze medal at the 2008 Summer Games.

Other competitions
Majorie Nelson was a Victorian softball player. She was the first softball player to represent any country at four World Series of Softball. She was the Australian captain in 1974 and 1978 and the World Series.

Australia earned a bronze medal at the 2005 World Cup. In 2009, they earned a silver at the World Cup of Softball.

Australia earned a gold medal at the 2005 Canada Cup. They earned a silver in 2008. They earned a bronze in 2011. Australia earned a silver medal at the 2005 Pacific Rim tournament.

2020 Olympic roster

Test series
In 1962, Australia played a test series against New Zealand in New Zealand. Australia won two out of three games in the test.

In March 2012, the team played a test series against the Japan women's national softball team in Canberra.

Indigenous representation
Stacey Porter was the team's first aboriginal teammate to represent Australia in softball the Olympics. Other aboriginal members of the national team include Vanessa Stokes.

References

External links
Softball Australia

Softball
Women's national softball teams
Softball in Australia